East Singhbhum is one of the 24 districts of Jharkhand, India. It was created on 16 January 1990. More than 50% of the district is covered by dense forests and mountains, where wild animals once roamed freely. It is known for being a centre of industry since Jamshedpur, the most populous city in Jharkhand, is located here.

Geography
The district is bounded on the east by Jhargram district, on the north by Purulia district, both of West Bengal, on the west by Seraikela Kharsawan district, and on the south by Mayurbhanj district of Odisha. Total area of the district is 3,562 kilometers. The district is a mineral rich and industrialized region. Dalma Wildlife Sanctuary is a popular biosphere reserve known lively for its animals. Dalma Hills is stretching over Jharkhand and West Bengal. It is on the northern region of Jamshedpur. A lot of minerals are found here.

Politics 

 |}

Administration 
There are six Vidhan Sabha constituencies in this district: Baharagora, Ghatsila, Potka, Jugsalai, Jamshedpur East and Jamshedpur West. All of these are part of Jamshedpur Lok Sabha constituency. East Singhbhum district consists of 11 Blocks. The following are the list of the Blocks in East Singhbhum district:

Golmuri cum Jugsalai
Potka
Patamda
Boram
Ghatshila
Musabani
Dumaria
Gurbandha
Dhalbhumgarh
Baharagora
Chakulia

Economy
East Singhbhum district has a leading position in respect of mining and other industrial activities in Jharkhand state. Jamshedpur, a leading industrial city of India, is the district headquarter of East Singbhum. An almost five-decade old copper refinery of Hindustan Copper Limited is in Moubhandar, Ghatsila, another town of the district. The Singhbhum Shear Zone, a geological feature lying between river Subarnarekha on the northeast and Dhanjauri ranges on the southwest houses the mines of Copper and Uranium. Most notable copper mines are Banalopa, Badia, Pathargora, Dhobni, Kendadih, Rakha and Surda in Musabani. Of these, only Surda remains operational. Surda is currently operated by India Resources Ltd (www.Indiaresources.com.au), an Australian mining company. Uranium Corporation of India explores uranium in Jadugora, Narwapahar, Bhatin, Turamdih and Baghjanta.

Chakulia, an important town in the southeastern part of the district, is famous for its rice mills, oil mills, washing soap factories, and bamboo production.

In 2006 the Ministry of Panchayati Raj named East Singhbhum one of the country's 250 most backward districts (out of a total of 640). It is one of the 21 districts in Jharkhand currently receiving funds from the Backward Regions Grant Fund Programme (BRGF).

Culture
Santhali, Ho, Munda, Bhumij, Kudmali, Bengali, Odia and Hindi are the major languages spoken here. The most prominent festivals of the district are Durga Puja, Makar Sankranti, Sohrai, Mage Porob, Baa Porob, Hermuutu, Heroh Porob, Karam Porob, Jomnama Porob, Jomsuim and Kali Puja. While other festivals such as Sarhul, Karma, Tusu, Java, Hall Punhya, Bhagta Parab, Ropini, Bandna and Jani-Shikaar are also celebrated with pomp and joy.

One tourist attraction is Chitreshwar temple situated in Chitreshwar village in Baharagora Block 12 km from Baharagora. The temple is said to be one of the largest natural Shiva linga. Many devotees of Shiva come daily. Chitreshwar temple is believed to have the largest Shiva linga after Lingaraja Shiva linga in Bhubneshwar. It has another temple called Bhuteshwar which is in Baharagora Block. Ghatsila a famous tourist spot is also situated in the district which was once inhabited by renowned Bengali novelist Bibhutibhushan Bandyopadhyay. Rankini Temple located near the mining town of Jadugora and Ghatshila are also worth mentioning. Goddess Rankini is held in high esteem and worshiped by the tribal and non tribal people inhabiting the district.

Demographics
According to the 2011 census East Singhbhum district has a population of 2,293,919, roughly equal to the nation of Latvia or the US state of New Mexico. This gives it a ranking of 199th in India (out of a total of 640). Its population growth rate over the decade 2001-2011 was  15.53%. Purbi Singhbhum has a sex ratio of 949 females for every 1000 males, and a literacy rate of 76.13%. Scheduled Castes and Schedule Tribes made up 4.9% and 28.5% of the population respectively.

Hindus made up 67.58% of the population, while Muslims were 8.89%, Sikhs 1.68% and Christians 1.32%. Those belonging to other religions  were 20.29% of the population.

At the time of the 2011 Census of India, 34.42% of the population in the district spoke Bengali, 16.83% Hindi, 15.92% Santali, 7.28% Urdu, 5.65% Bhojpuri, 5.27% Odia, 2.76% Ho, 2.73% Mundari, 1.86% Punjabi, 1.51% Magahi and 1.28% Maithili as their first language.

References

External links

East Singhbhum district administration website

 
Districts of Jharkhand
1990 establishments in Bihar